Natalie McGiffert (born March 14, 1997) is an American group rhythmic gymnast. She competed at the 2015 World Rhythmic Gymnastics Championships.

McGiffert won a gold medal and two silver medals as part of the American team in group rhythmic gymnastics events at the 2015 Pan American Games. She was part of the American team in the women's rhythmic group all-around event at the 2016 Summer Olympics.

References

1997 births
Living people
American rhythmic gymnasts
Place of birth missing (living people)
Gymnasts at the 2015 Pan American Games
Pan American Games gold medalists for the United States
Pan American Games silver medalists for the United States
Pan American Games medalists in gymnastics
Gymnasts at the 2016 Summer Olympics
Olympic gymnasts of the United States
Medalists at the 2015 Pan American Games
21st-century American women